James Edward Jacob (born 28 March 1989), better known by his stage name Jakwob, is a British music producer, songwriter and DJ.

Early life
As a multi-instrumentalist, Jacob has been involved in many bands since his early teenage years – starting out in jazz but soon moving on to death metal and folk. His style is notable for transcending genres, particularly dubstep. His original work, remixes and productions combine elements of syncopated organic percussion, classical piano, sub bass and cinematic orchestral soundscapes.

2009present: Mainstream success
In 2009, Jacob won acclaim in the blog world for his bootleg of Ellie Goulding's "Starry Eyed". In November 2009, he was given his first airplay on national radio when his remix of Ellie Goulding's "Under the Sheets" was played on BBC Radio 1 as Zane Lowe's 'Hottest Record in the World'. (A title which has since been given to "Electrify" and "Please Ft. Kano".)

Jakwob released his debut single "Here with Me" on his own label, Boom Ting Recordings on 13 September 2010.

Production and songwriting

Artist discography

Remix discography

References

External links
 
 Home

Dubstep musicians
British DJs
Living people
1989 births
People from Hereford
Place of birth missing (living people)
Electronic dance music DJs